Yukon River Run is an American reality television series, produced by Gurney Productions for the National Geographic Channel. The series follows three crews travelling along the Yukon River in Alaska attempting to sell wood and other essential supplies to remote villages along the river, while competing against the other crews to maximise profit.

Broadcast
The series premiered in the U.S. on July 20, 2015 on the National Geographic Channel. It was also scheduled to air at later dates in the U.S. on Spanish language channel Nat Geo Mundo, as well as globally in 171 countries in 45 languages on international variations of National Geographic Channel.

In Australia, the series premiered ahead of the U.S. launch on July 6, 2015 on National Geographic Channel Australia. In the United Kingdom, the series began on National Geographic Channel UK & Ireland on July 26, 2015 and on National Geographic Channel Asia on September 15.

Episodes

References

External links
 

2015 American television series debuts
2010s American reality television series
English-language television shows
National Geographic (American TV channel) original programming
Television shows set in Alaska
Yukon River